Theater am Marientor  is a theatre in Duisburg, North Rhine-Westphalia, Germany.

Buildings and structures in Duisburg
Culture in Duisburg
Theatres in North Rhine-Westphalia